Hagios Onouphrios was an ancient Minoan city in southern Crete, on the Plain of Messara, a few miles west of Kannia and Gortyn.

See also 
 List of ancient Greek cities

References

Minoan geography